The Really Really Really Really Boring Album is the tenth studio and first children's album by Australian rock band, Regurgitator, (credited as Regurgitator's Pogogo Show) and was released in Australia on 1 March 2019.

The album was recorded with children's guitars and drums, tracked in a single afternoon in a Melbourne studio, and mixed the next day. Ben Ely said "Kids don't think about things, they just act; they don't think, 'I'm going to draw a fire truck', they just draw a fire truck. There's not very many premeditated ideas."

At the ARIA Music Awards of 2019, the album was nominated for ARIA Award for Best Children's Album.

At the AIR Awards of 2020, the album won Best Independent Children's Album or EP.

Reception

Jeff Jenkins from Stack Magazine said "Regurgitator have always been perverse purveyors of pop" and reviewed the album saying; "Call them the anti-Wiggles, but they'll entertain the kids – and parents – with an eclectic array of electro sounds and repetitive rhymes, beating boredom with wonderfully wacky tunes about pets, pillow fights, parties and pigeons."

Liz Giuffre from The Music AU said "Think the best of The Muppets – engaging but not patronising – while also keeping true to the Gurge's love of quirkiness. Highlights include 'Games On My Computer', Pillow Fight' and 'The Morning Theme'."

Andrew Stafford from The Guardian said "Brisbane rock band embrace their silly side and collaborate with their kids, and the result is anything but boring."

Ian Phillips from PS News said "Regurgitator has always come across as a knock about fun band who have never really developed the overblown egos and attitudes of most rock stars. Although they do take their music seriously they’ve always enjoyed mucking about and having fun. So, now that they're parents, it seems a natural progression that they decide to record an album of songs for kids. The result is an album and show that is anything but boring." [...] "It's a Regurgitator album that just happens to be written for kids.There are all the usual Regurgitator elements, a mix of punk, hip hop, pop, and funk but the songs content is squarely aimed at the preoccupations of kids."

Track listing

Release history

References

Regurgitator albums
2019 albums